David Winbanks (born 8 September 1962) is a former Australian rules footballer who played with the Sydney Swans and St Kilda in the Victorian Football League (VFL).

An Oakleigh Districts recruit, Winbanks played his football as a defender. He started at South Melbourne in 1981, then made the move to Sydney when the club relocated. In 1984 he switched to St Kilda, but made just two appearances.

References

1962 births
Australian rules footballers from Victoria (Australia)
Sydney Swans players
St Kilda Football Club players
Living people